The 1909 Toronto Argonauts season was the 26th season for the team since the franchise's inception in 1873. The team finished in third place in the Interprovincial Rugby Football Union with a 1–5 record and failed to qualify for the playoffs.

It was the Argonaut Football Club's 12th season of organized league play since joining the Ontario Rugby Football Union in 1898, and its third season in the Interprovincial Rugby Football Union. The team finished in third place in the "Big Four" league with one win and five losses and failed to qualify for the Dominion playoffs.

The team was managed by Argonaut rowing great Joe Wright, a former Double Blue player, who took a hand in coaching the squad along with captain and quarterback Warren Coryell. This proved to the be last season in their history that the Argos played a season without a dedicated coach.

Regular season

Standings

Schedule

References

Toronto Argonauts seasons